Gregory Halford (born 8 December 1984) is an English semi-professional and former professional footballer who plays for Isthmian League North Division club Hashtag United. He is naturally a right-back or centre-back but can play in numerous positions including central midfield, right midfield and even as a striker.

Born in Chelmsford, Halford began his career with Colchester United where he came through the youth system before moving to Reading in 2007. His stay at Reading was a short one and Halford transferred to Sunderland later the same year. After failing to hold down a regular place with Sunderland, he moved to Wolverhampton Wanderers in 2009 and later to Portsmouth in 2010, Nottingham Forest in 2012, and Rotherham United in 2015. He signed for Cardiff City in January 2017, where he went on to achieve promotion to the Premier League the following season by finishing second in the Championship. Halford has also played for Charlton Athletic, Sheffield United, Brighton & Hove Albion and Birmingham City on loan at various points in his career, as well as representing England at under-20 level.

Club career

Colchester United 
Halford was born in Chelmsford, Essex. He started his football career in July 2001 when he joined Colchester United's youth team. He signed a professional contract on 1 August 2002, made his first-team debut in a 5–0 home defeat to Luton Town on 21 April 2003, and scored his first senior goal in a 2–1 defeat at home to Hartlepool United in March 2004. In the second half of the 2002–03 season, he spent time on loan at Braintree Town and Aylesbury United.

Halford continued his progress at Colchester: he picked up the club's Young Player of the Year award for the 2004–05 season, and was named in the Professional Footballers' Association's 2005–06 League One Team of the Year as Colchester finished as runners-up in League One and gained promotion to the Championship.

In over 150 games in five years for the Layer Road first team, he gained the reputation of being a utility man, having played in defence, midfield and attack for club and country. His last manager, Geraint Williams, preferred to play him at right back. He also had a reputation for a long throw, with a high percentage of Colchester's goals in the 2005–06 season coming from Halford's long throw. He said "I tried measuring it one time – it was half the pitch, 50 yards."

Reading
Keen to prove himself at a higher level, Halford handed in a transfer request in August 2006 after interest from several Premier League clubs. According to the player, a "big offer" from Sheffield United was rejected. He was linked with a number of other Premier League clubs, but on 30 January 2007, Reading completed the signing of Halford for an undisclosed fee, believed to be in excess of the club's previous record of £2.25 million, on a contract that would keep him at Reading until June 2010. His debut for Reading came as a substitute appearance in their 0–0 home draw with Portsmouth on 17 March 2007, where he played for the last few minutes on the left wing. He made his full debut in Reading's 1–0 defeat away to Tottenham Hotspur on 1 April 2007, where he conceded a penalty in a controversial handball decision. Halford failed to establish himself at Reading, and played only once more. Director of Football Nicky Hammond said that although Halford had not made the impact desired by both club and player, that was no reflection on him personally or professionally, and that "sometimes in football, players do move on quite quickly if it's felt that the fit isn't quite right".

Sunderland
Halford signed a four-year contract with Premier League club Sunderland on 11 June 2007. The fee was variously reported as £2.5 million rising to £3m depending on appearances, or as £3.5m. Hammond said it was an excellent deal for Reading financially, and Sunderland manager Roy Keane was "delighted" that Halford had joined.

He made his debut for Sunderland on 15 August 2007 in a 2–2 draw with Birmingham City at St Andrew's, and played in the next three matches, but was sent off in the third, a 3–0 League Cup defeat to Luton Town. He made three more appearances, and was again sent off. In January 2008, following reported interest in him from Crystal Palace and Charlton Athletic, Keane confirmed that Sunderland would listen to offers. He was not sold, but instead joined Charlton on loan for the rest of the season. He played regularly in the Championship, and scored twice, against West Bromwich Albion and Wolverhampton Wanderers.

Halford spent the 2008–09 season on loan to Championship club Sheffield United. He made his debut in the opening game of the season, at Birmingham City, scored his first goal a fortnight later, against Blackpool, and went on to play regularly throughout the season, appearing in 49 of the club's 56 fixtures. He scored eight goals altogether, including the only goal of the semi-final against Preston North End that took Sheffield United through to the 2008–09 play-off final.

Wolverhampton Wanderers
Halford signed for newly promoted Premier League side Wolverhampton Wanderers on 3 July 2009 in a three-year deal for an undisclosed fee. He made his debut on 15 August against West Ham United, and went on to make 17 Premier League appearances for Wolves, along with 3 in cup competitions. He mostly played on the right of midfield or at right back. As with earlier in his career, long throw-ins were a strong feature of his game.

Portsmouth
Unable to stake a claim to regular football at Molineux, Halford joined Championship club Portsmouth in October 2010 on a month's loan. He made his debut in a victory over Millwall, and his first goal, on 23 October, secured a 2–1 win at Hull City. On 17 November, the loan was extended for a further month, then until January, and then to the end of the season. He was used mostly as a centre back in 2011, with fellow loanee Ritchie De Laet preferred at right back.

On 11 July 2011, Halford signed a three-year contract with Portsmouth. The fee, officially undisclosed, was believed by The News to be in the region of £1m. He finished the season with seven goals, which made him the club's second highest scorer, behind only David Norris with eight. Portsmouth were unable to avoid relegation.

Nottingham Forest
With the club on the brink of closure unless they removed senior players from the wage bill, Portsmouth sold Halford to Championship club Nottingham Forest on 27 July 2012 for an undisclosed fee. He made his debut on 13 August in the League Cup against Fleetwood Town, made his league debut five days later against Bristol City, and scored his first Forest goal in the 4–1 win over Barnsley in October, in a performance that earned him a place in that week's Football League Championship Team of the Week.

After the 3–0 home win over Bolton Wanderers in August 2013, in which Halford was deployed as a striker, manager Billy Davies said he now regarded him "predominantly as a front man". Halford appeared regularly for Forest during that season, but not at all the next. He spent time on loan to Brighton & Hove Albion during 2014–15 before being released when his contract expired in June 2015.

Rotherham United
In July 2015, Halford joined Rotherham United on a free transfer.
 He was appointed captain, but after only five league gamesfour losses and a drawmanager Steve Evans replaced him with Lee Frecklington. Halford played only once more before joining fellow Championship club Birmingham City on 26 November 2015, on loan until 2 January 2016. He made his Birmingham debut as a late substitute in a goalless draw at Middlesbrough on 12 December, and after two more appearances off the bench, he returned to Rotherham when his loan expired.

Cardiff City
On 6 January 2017, Halford joined Cardiff City, signing an 18-month contract, making his debut two days later in a 2–1 defeat to Fulham in the third round of the FA Cup. He scored his first goal for Cardiff in a 2–1 EFL Cup win against former club Portsmouth on 8 August 2017.

At the end of the 2017–18 season, Halford left the club after his contract expired on 30 June.

Aberdeen
On 26 February 2019, Halford joined Aberdeen until the end of the season. He left at the end of his contract.

Southend United
Halford signed for Southend United of League Two on a short-term deal on 15 December 2020. Hours later, he made his debut as a substitute against Grimsby Town and scored the final goal in a 3–1 win. On 18 January 2021, Halford signed a contract extension to remain at the club until the end of the 2020–21 season.

Waterford
On 23 July 2021, it was announced that Halford had signed for League of Ireland Premier Division club Waterford. He made his debut for the club the same day in an FAI Cup tie away to Athlone Town, and scored a 91st-minute equaliser. The match stood at 4–4 after extra time, and Waterford won on penalties. He made a total of 17 appearances in all competitions for the club, scoring two goals, as they were relegated to the League of Ireland First Division.

Billericay Town
On 12 February 2022, Halford signed for National League South side Billericay Town.

Hashtag United
On 27 August 2022, Isthmian League North Division side Hashtag United announced the signing of Halford on 27 August 2022. He made his debut the same day in an Isthmian League game at home to Stowmarket Town, scoring an opening own goal before his quick free kick led to a late equaliser.

International career
Halford was capped for England at U20 level. He made his debut against Portugal in the Toulon Tournament on 4 June 2005, and scored his first international goal in a 3–0 win against South Korea two days later.

Style of play
Halford has been praised for his versatility, to the extent that he is referred to as a utility player.

During his time at Colchester, he played primarily on the right-hand side of midfield, though appeared in the centre of midfield, as a right-back, and a forward, where he scored six goals in nine games. While at Forest, the Nottingham Post stated that during the 2012–13 season, Halford "played in every position on the pitch for Forest, asides from actually taking the keeper's gloves", going on to add that he did "not look out of place" as either a full back or "even in wide positions in midfield", with manager Billy Davies also installing Halford as a striker. Upon signing for Cardiff in 2017, manager Neil Warnock, who had managed Halford at Rotherham, commented that "he played five or six positions" in the previous season.

Career statistics

Honours
Cardiff City
EFL Championship runner-up: 2017–18

Individual
PFA Team of the Year: 2005–06 League One

References

External links

Greg Halford profile at the Rotherham United F.C. website

1984 births
Living people
Sportspeople from Chelmsford
English footballers
England youth international footballers
Association football defenders
Association football midfielders
Association football utility players
Colchester United F.C. players
Braintree Town F.C. players
Aylesbury United F.C. players
Reading F.C. players
Sunderland A.F.C. players
Charlton Athletic F.C. players
Sheffield United F.C. players
Wolverhampton Wanderers F.C. players
Portsmouth F.C. players
Nottingham Forest F.C. players
Brighton & Hove Albion F.C. players
Rotherham United F.C. players
Birmingham City F.C. players
Cardiff City F.C. players
Aberdeen F.C. players
Southend United F.C. players
Waterford F.C. players
Billericay Town F.C. players
Hashtag United F.C. players
English Football League players
Premier League players
Scottish Professional Football League players
League of Ireland players
National League (English football) players
Isthmian League players
Expatriate association footballers in the Republic of Ireland